The Battle of Yiling was fought between the warlords Sun Quan and Cao Cao in 208 in the late Eastern Han dynasty. The battle was an integral part in the Red Cliffs campaign, as it was fought immediately after the major engagement at Wulin (烏林; in present-day Honghu, Hubei) during the Battle of Red Cliffs. The Battle of Yiling was also the prelude to the subsequent Battle of Jiangling.

Background
Immediately after Cao Cao's defeat at Wulin in the Battle of Red Cliffs, Zhou Yu led 30,000 troops into Nan Commandery in a move to capture Jing Province's capital city, Jiangling (江陵; in present-day Jingjiang 荆江, not to be confused with present-day Jiangling County, Hubei). Zhou Yu's army camped on the southern bank of the Yangtze River. Before engaging Cao Cao's general Cao Ren, Zhou Yu ordered Gan Ning to take Yiling (夷陵; present-day Yichang, Hubei) as a preemptive move to secure the entrance to Yi Province (covering present-day Sichuan and Chongqing). In addition, if Yiling was captured, Cao Ren would be isolated from Yi Province's governor Liu Zhang, who was sending reinforcements to support him.

The battle

Defection of Xi Su
The commander of Yiling, Xi Su, was originally an official under Liu Zhang and he hated Cao Cao. When Gan Ning's troops reached Yiling, Xi Su surrendered without a fight. As Gan Ning's force reached 1,000 (Gan had 700 men initially), Zhou Yu wanted to merge Xi Su and his 300 troops into Lü Meng's unit to strengthen the main force. Lü Meng refused the offer and appealed to Sun Quan not to reassign Xi Su and his 300 men, but rather, keep Xi Su with Gan Ning to reinforce defenses at Yiling. Sun Quan agreed to Lü Meng's proposal. When Cao Ren learnt that Yiling had fallen, he immediately sent 6,000 cavalry to retake the city. Under intense pressure, Gan Ning remained calm and stabilized his army's morale.

Lü Meng's strategies
As Gan Ning's request for reinforcements reached Zhou Yu, nearly "everyone pointed out that there were not enough men to spare as a relief force". However, Lü Meng stood up and urged his colleagues to go and support Gan Ning, and guaranteed that Ling Tong could defend their main camp on his own for at least ten days. Zhou Yu followed Lü Meng's advice and left Ling Tong to defend his current position while leading Lü Meng and others to help Gan Ning.

Ling Tong took up the burden of facing Cao Ren and Xu Huang alone, in order to buy time for Zhou Yu, Lü Meng, and others to help Gan Ning at Yiling. Cao Ren did not expect Zhou Yu to ignore his massive army at Jiangling, and was consequently defeated at Yiling, suffering more than 3,000 casualties. Meanwhile, Ling Tong deceived Cao Ren into believing there was still a sizable army left in Zhou Yu's main camp, so Cao did not launch an all-out assault on Ling. Instead, Cao Ren sent Xu Huang to attack Ling Tong but failed. En route back to the main camp, Lü Meng suggested a plan to capture enemy warhorses: he would lead 300 soldiers to block the enemy's retreat route with bundles of firewood so the horses were unable to pass through. As Lü Meng expected, in order to escape from Zhou Yu's pursuit, Cao Ren's cavalry abandoned their steeds and fled back to Jiangling on foot. Zhou Yu returned with over 300 captured enemy warhorses and Yiling remained firmly in Sun Quan's control for the rest of the war.

Aftermath
The fall of Yiling meant that Sun Quan's forces had opened up the entrance to Yi Province. It also implied that Cao Ren, who was in Jiangling, would no longer receive any reinforcements from Liu Zhang.

Order of battle

Cao Cao forces
General Who Attacks the South Cao Ren, stationed in Jiangling (江陵; located in present-day Jingjiang 荊江, not to be confused with present-day Jiangling County, Hubei)
General Who Sweeps Across the Wilderness" Xu Huang, stationed in Jiangling 
General Xi Su, from Yi Province, stationed at Yiling (夷陵, present-day Yichang, Hubei), later defected to Sun Quan

Sun Quan forces
General in the Center Protecting the Army Zhou Yu
Colonel Who Praises the Army Lu Su, served as Zhou Yu's deputy
Right Area Commander Cheng Pu
Commandant of Danyang Huang Gai, served as vanguard of the navy
General of the Household Who Swipes Across the Wilderness Lü Meng
Prefect of Dangkou Gan Ning
General of the Household Han Dang
Chief of Yichun Zhou Tai
Commandant Who Inherits Fierceness Ling Tong

Notes

References
Chen Shou. Records of Three Kingdoms.
Sima Guang. Zizhi Tongjian.
Selected Examples of Battles in Ancient China Writing Team, Selected Examples of Battles in Ancient China, 1st Edition, published by Chinese Publishing House & Distributed by New China Bookstore Publishing House in Beijing, 1981 - 1984.
Yuan, Tingdong, War in Ancient China, 1st Edition, published by Sichuan Academy of Social Science Publishing House & Distributed by New China Bookstore in Chengdu, 1988, 
Zhang, Xiaosheng, General View of War of Ancient China, 1st Edition in Xi'an, published by Long March Publishing House in Beijing & Distributed by New China Bookstore in Beijing, 1988,  (set)

208
Yiling 208
Military history of Hubei